Czarna Woda (Polish for "black water") is a river of Poland, a tributary of the Kaczawa, which it meets in Legnica. The Czarna Woda is 48km long. It flows through Lower Silesian Voivodeship and has  
water falls in Legnica. The river also flows through marshes at Wierzbowskie taking a westerly direction from the village of Wierzbowa. The river flows through Legnica District. Its main tributaries are the Skora and Siekierna Rivers.

Towns on the river include Wierzbowa, Rokitki, Grzymalin, Bukowna, Rzeszotary and Legnica.

References

Rivers of Poland
Rivers of Lower Silesian Voivodeship